Utyaganovo (Ütägän) is a rural locality (a village) in Tazlarovsky Selsoviet, Burayevsky District, Bashkortostan, Russia. The population was 135 as of 2010. There are five streets.

Geography 
Utyaganovo is located 11 km east of Burayevo (the district's administrative centre) by road. Novotazlarovo is the nearest rural locality.

References 

Rural localities in Burayevsky District